Chek Keng is an area and village of Sai Kung North in Hong Kong. It is administratively part of Tai Po District.

Location
Chek Keng is located within Sai Kung East Country Park, on the northern coast of Sai Kung Peninsula and facing the Chek Keng Hau aka East Arm Bay of Long Harbour.

Administration
Chek Keng is a recognized village under the New Territories Small House Policy.

History
Chek Keng was probably founded more than 200 years ago. It was historically a multi-surname Hakka village. It was reported in 2003 that Chek Keng had only one resident, an 84 year old woman.

Features

Chapel
The Holy Family Chapel in Chek Keng was built in 1874 to replace an earlier chapel that had been severely damaged by a storm in 1867. The whole village later converted to Catholicism. During the Japanese Occupation of Hong Kong, the chapel was a base of the Hong Kong-Kowloon Independent Battalion of the East River Guerrilla. The chapel is listed as a Grade II historic building.

Others
 Chek Keng Pier
 Bradbury Hall youth hostel

Transportation
Chek Keng is not accessible by car. It is located along the Stage 2 of the MacLehose Trail, about an hour's walk from Pak Tam Au.

A kai-to service is available between Wong Shek, Wan Tsai (Nam Fung Wan) and Chek Keng.

References

External links

 Delineation of area of existing village Chek Keng (Sai Kung North) for election of resident representative (2019 to 2022)
 Chek Keng - A Piece of Sai Kung History
 Pictures of Chek Keng
 Picture of the Holy Family Chapel in Chek Keng

Villages in Tai Po District, Hong Kong
Sai Kung North